Christian Duus Pedersen (born 21 May 1974) is a retired Danish football defender.

References

1974 births
Living people
Danish men's footballers
Silkeborg IF players
Association football defenders
Danish Superliga players
Denmark under-21 international footballers